The Singles 1991–1996 is a box set containing six CD singles by the band Pantera that was released on 23 September 1996, in Australia only.

Content
The box set contains six CDs, all presented in a cardboard box.

This is quite a rare item and many have damaged boxes.

Track listing

"I'm Broken"
All tracks by Pantera unless noted otherwise.
"I'm Broken" – 04:25
"Slaughtered" – 03:57
"Domination" (live) – 06:34
"Primal Concrete Sledge" (live) – 03:57
 NOTE: Tracks three and four were recorded live in Moscow on September 28, 1991 at Monsters of Rock.

"5 Minutes Alone"
"5 Minutes Alone" – 05:49
"The Badge" (Poison Idea cover) – 03:56
"Cemetery Gates" – 07:02

"Mouth for War"
"Mouth for War" – 03:57
"Rise" – 04:37
"Cowboys from Hell" (live) – 04:16
"Heresy" (live) – 05:05

"Walk"
"Walk" – 05:16
"A New Level" – 03:59
"Walk" (Cervical dub extended) – 06:41
"Walk" (Cervical edit) – 05:10

"Planet Caravan" part one
"Planet Caravan" (Ozzy Osbourne, Tony Iommi, Geezer Butler, Bill Ward) – 4:03
"The Badge" (Poison Idea cover) – 03:57
"A New Level" (live) – 05:43
"Becoming" (live) – 04:05
 NOTE: Tracks three and four were recorded live at the 'Brixton Academy' in London, England on September 12, 1994.

"Planet Caravan" part two
"Planet Caravan" (Ozzy Osbourne, Tony Iommi, Geezer Butler, Bill Ward) – 4:03
"By Demons Be Driven" (Biomechanical mix) – 04:18
"Heresy" (live) – 05:00
"Cowboys from Hell" (live) – 05:08

Personnel
Phil Anselmo – vocals
Rex Brown – bass
"Dimebag" Darrell – guitar
Vinnie Paul – drums

Chart positions

References

Pantera albums
1996 compilation albums